Houdin is a French surname. Notable people with the surname include:

 Jean Eugène Robert-Houdin (1805–1871), French watchmaker, magician, and illusionist
 Jean-Pierre Houdin (born 1951), French architect

See also
 Houdini

French-language surnames